Dodworth is a ward in the Dearne Valley in the metropolitan borough of Barnsley, South Yorkshire, England.  The ward contains 17 listed buildings that are recorded in the National Heritage List for England.  All the listed buildings are designated at Grade II, the lowest of the three grades, which is applied to "buildings of national importance and special interest".   The ward contains the village of Dodworth and the surrounding area.  Most of the listed buildings are houses and associated structures, farmhouses and farm buildings.  The other listed buildings consist of a church, a public house, a milestone, and a war memorial.


Buildings

References

Citations

Sources

 

Lists of listed buildings in South Yorkshire
Buildings and structures in the Metropolitan Borough of Barnsley